The Black Swan is the 23rd and last studio album by the Scottish folk singer Bert Jansch. It was released in 2006 through Drag City. Jansch described the album: "It's been fantastic working with everyone who's been involved on the record. They all came to it from a standpoint of being fans of my music, so while there are lots of great musicians making wonderful contributions to the record it still has a very acoustic, intimate feel – and there's still a lot of me on there!"

Track listing 
All tracks composed by Bert Jansch, except where indicated
 "The Black Swan" - features Helena Espvall - 6:25
 "High Days" - 3:47
 "When the Sun Comes Up" - features Beth Orton - 3:54
 "Katie Cruel" (traditional, arr. Jansch) - features Beth Orton and Devendra Banhart - 2:59
 "My Pocket's Empty" (traditional, arr. Jansch) - 3:49
 "Watch the Stars" (traditional, arr. Jansch) - features Beth Orton and Kevin Barker - 2:54
 "A Woman Like You" - 4:13
 "The Old Triangle" (Brendan Behan) - 4:06
 "Bring Your Religion" - 3:05
 "Texas Cowboy Blues" - 3:07
 "Magdalina's Dance" (Jansch, Paul Wassif) - 3:19
 "Hey Pretty Girl" - 3:03

Personnel 

Bert Jansch: guitar and vocals

Beth Orton: vocals (3, 4 & 6), guitar (6)

Devendra Banhart: vocals (4)

Paul Wassif: guitar (5), slide guitar (7), banjo (11)

Noah Georgeson: percussion (1), bass (9 & 10)

Otto Hauser: drums (3, 5, 6 & 9), percussion (4 & 7)

Kevin Barker: lead guitar (6), percussion (4)

Helena Espvall: cello (1)

Adam Jansch: keyboards (1 & 9)

David Roback: slide guitar (3)

Richard Good: slide guitar (9)

Pete Newsom: drums (10)

Maggie Boyle: flute (11)

References 

2006 albums
Bert Jansch albums
Drag City (record label) albums